The Crenshaw site (3MI6) is a multiple-mound Caddo ceremonial center located in the Great Bend Region of the Red River in Miller County, Arkansas. It is known for the presence of both "pre-Caddo" or Fourche Maline materials and later Caddo materials. It also has some characteristics that separate it from many other sites including a causeway between two of the mounds, a pile with over 2,000 deer antler, and deposits of human skulls and detached mandibles representing over 300 individuals.

The site was listed on the National Register of Historic Places in 1994.

See also
National Register of Historic Places listings in Miller County, Arkansas

References

Miller County, Arkansas
Archaeological sites on the National Register of Historic Places in Arkansas
National Register of Historic Places in Miller County, Arkansas